The Shepherds Flat Wind Farm is an 845 megawatt (MW) wind farm in the eastern part of U.S. state of Oregon, near Arlington, in both Gilliam and Morrow counties. Groundbreaking occurred in 2009, and it officially opened in September 2012.

The wind farm was built by Caithness Energy using General Electric GE2.5XL 2.5 MW wind turbines, and it supplies electricity to Southern California Edison. The wind farm is estimated to have an economic impact of $16 million annually for Oregon. It is one of the largest land-based wind farms in the world.

Details
The wind farm is located in eastern Oregon in both Morrow and Gilliam counties, with the majority of the turbines in the latter. Oregon provided tax incentives to the developer to help land the facility, but the project is expected to provide Gilliam County with about $5 million annually in taxes and fees when it is operating.

Plans for the project first came in 2002 for a 105 megawatt project, with the plan changed to larger project in 2004. The project was then submitted to the state in 2006 with plans to have the first phase online in 2008. Early plans called for 303 turbines and a generating capacity of 909 megawatts. At the time, it would have doubled the capacity for wind-generated power in Oregon. The farm is divided into several sections, with the Willow Creek Wind Farm between two of the larger segments.

Approved in 2008 by state regulators, groundbreaking came in 2009.  The project design now includes 338 GE2.5XL turbines built by GE Wind Energy, each with a capacity to produce 2.5 megawatts, and used for the first time in United States. These turbines and a ten-year service contract cost a total of $1.4 billion, the largest expense on the estimated $2 billion project. In December 2010, the Department of Energy (DOE) offered a $1.3 billion loan guarantee for the project. The insurance fee for the loan guarantee would be paid from federal stimulus money through the Financial Institution Partnership Program.  Generating capacity will be 845 megawatts, producing an estimated 2 billion kWh each year, enough to provide electricity to 235,000 homes. Once operational, the facility will have about 35 permanent employees. The wind farm is estimated to have an economic benefit of $16 million annually for Oregon.
 
In April 2011, Google announced they had invested $100 million in the project, part of a $500 million investment package announced by General Electric and including as investors, also, subsidiaries of Itochu Corp. and Sumitomo Corporation. The facility was officially opened on September 22, 2012.

Electricity production

Concerns
There are concerns that have been raised by taxpayer watchdog groups and various blogs. They point out that large private ranch owners in the area will receive up to $12,000 annually per turbine leased on their land, while they have already received tens of millions of dollars in U.S. government subsidies over the years and then benefiting from taxpayer subsidies of the wind energy industry. Some local ranchers due to benefit or already benefiting from the partially government subsidized wind energy projects were published as receiving nearly $1 million in government agricultural subsidies in 2008 alone.

See also

Biglow Canyon Wind Farm
Wind power in the United States
Wind power in Oregon
List of onshore wind farms

References

External links
 BPA.gov: Shepherds Flat Wind Farm — Shepherds Flat Wind Farm (archived)
U.S. Department of Energy: Shepherds Flat Wind Farm — Shepherds Flat Wind Farm (archived)

Wind farms in Oregon
Buildings and structures in Gilliam County, Oregon
Buildings and structures in Morrow County, Oregon
Energy infrastructure completed in 2012
2012 establishments in Oregon
Itochu
Southern California Edison